San Diego Christian College (SDCC) is a private, evangelical college in Santee, California, a suburb of San Diego. Founded in 1970, SDCC offers traditional, non-traditional, and graduate programs.

History
In January 1970, Tim F. LaHaye, pastor of the former Scott Memorial Baptist Church of San Diego and co-author of the fictional Left Behind series of books, Art Peters and Henry M. Morris discussed the need for a Christian college on the West Coast where studies could be developed within the framework of creationism based on the Genesis creation narrative. That year, classes began at Christian Heritage College, supported by Scott Memorial Baptist Church. The first degrees were awarded in 1973.

In 1984, it was first accredited by the Western Association of Schools and Colleges (WASC). In 2005, the college changed its name to San Diego Christian College. In 2015, the college moved to its new location in Santee, CA.

Campus 

In 2005, Christian Heritage College became San Diego Christian College and in 2014, SDCC moved to its new campus in Santee. The new campus consists of five buildings, with an athletic annex office and residential apartments which are located 1.8 miles off campus.

Its five buildings include smart classrooms, laboratories, chapel auditorium, cafeteria, counseling rooms, a library and faculty and staff offices. The library has a growing collection of over 450,000 items. Aviators train at Gillespie Field in El Cajon.

SDCC's fountain displays the institution's core values of truth, purpose, and impact.

Academics
The college offers Associate of Arts, Bachelor of Arts, Bachelor of Science degrees as well as Master of Arts and Master of Science Degrees, and teacher's credentials.

San Diego Christian College has been accredited by the Western Association of Schools and Colleges (WASC) since 1984. On June 23, 2006, WASC reviewed San Diego Christian College and placed its accreditation on probation. This was because the college was unable to demonstrate its "autonomy." The commission on February 2, 2007, found the college had taken a "number of significant and positive steps" in addressing its concerns, but still found it to be in "noncompliance," so another visit was scheduled for the Spring of 2008. In June 2008, San Diego Christian College received a reaffirmation of accreditation.

In its 2020 rankings, U.S. News & World Report ranks San Diego Christian College as #11 in its "Regional Colleges West" category (not to be confused with "Regional Universities West"), out of the 64 schools listed in that category ("regional college" is defined as "colleges focus on undergraduate education but grant fewer than half their degrees in liberal arts disciplines"). PayScale ranks SDCC very low on its "College Return on Investment" list, placing it at 1,591 out of the 1,995 listed (including financial aid).

Athletics
The San Diego Christian College (SDCC) athletic teams are called the Hawks. The college is a member of the National Association of Intercollegiate Athletics (NAIA), primarily competing in the Golden State Athletic Conference (GSAC) since the 1999–2000 academic year. They were also a member of the National Christian College Athletic Association (NCCAA), primarily competing as an independent in the West Region of the Division I level.

SDCC competes in 14 intercollegiate varsity sports: Men's sports include baseball, basketball, cross country, golf, soccer and tennis; while women's sports include basketball, beach volleyball, cross country, golf, soccer, softball, tennis and volleyball.

Tennis
In just their first year of a program in 2015, the SDCC men's tennis team went to the NAIA National Tournament held in Mobile, Ala. The Hawks lost in the Quarterfinal round against eventual winner and No. 1 team Georgia Gwinnett. The Hawks were ranked as high as No. 8 in the NAIA Top 25 Poll during the season.

Baseball
In 2014, the SDCC baseball team was a finalist in the NAIA World Series after a record breaking year. The Hawks finished with a 42-20 overall record that included a GSAC Regular Season Championship as well as being ranked fifth in the NAIA Top 25 Poll.

Men's basketball
Competing at that time in the NCCAA, the Hawks won the NCCAA men's basketball championship in 1990, 1997, 1998 and 2004. They were second in 2000, losing to Bethel by a score of 83–82. They finished third in 1996 and 2003. They also went to the 2001 NAIA final four in Men's Basketball.

Women's basketball
The Hawks won the NCCAA women's basketball championship in 2003. The women's Volleyball team won the first National titles for the school in volleyball 1998, 2000 and took second in 1996 and 1999.

Notable people

Students and alumni

Faculty and employees

References

External links 
 
 Official athletics website

Universities and colleges in San Diego County, California
Santee, California
Liberal arts colleges in California
Private universities and colleges in California
Council for Christian Colleges and Universities
Evangelicalism in California
Schools accredited by the Western Association of Schools and Colleges
1970 establishments in California
Educational institutions established in 1970
Evangelical universities and colleges in the United States